Meryl is a given name, and may refer to:

In people:
 Meryl, a musical artist originating from the Martinique 
 Meryl Cassie (born 1984), New Zealand actress
 Meryl Davis (born 1987), American ice dancer
 Meryl Fernandes (born 1983), British actress
 Meryl Fernando (1923-2007), Sri Lankan Sinhala teacher, trade unionist, and politician
 Meryl Getline (born 1953), American pilot, author, and columnist
 Meryl Streep (born 1949), American actress
 Meryl Swanson (born 1970), Australian politician
 Meryl Tankard (born 1955), Australian dancer and choreographer
 Meryl Vladimer (21st century), artist, theatrical producer, and political activist
 Maryla Rodowicz (born 1945), Polish pop singer

In fiction:
 Meryl Burbank, a character "played" by Hannah Gill in The Truman Show
 Meryl Silverburgh, a character who appears in Policenauts and in the Metal Gear series.
 Meryl Stryfe, a character who appears in Trigun.

Trademarks:
 Meryl is also a trademarked brand of Nylon from Nylstar